The Evangelical Reformed Church in Japan was founded by South African missionaries.  They formed their first congregation in Oita Prefecture. Japanese pastors joined this work. Two mission congregations were founded. The church adheres to the Apostles' Creed and the Westminster Confession of Faith.

References 

Reformed denominations in Japan
Christian evangelical denominations in Japan